Rynersonite  is an oxide mineral. It crystallizes in the orthorhombic crystal system.  It is dull, translucent mineral, fibrous in nature.  Usually off-white to pale pink in color. It occurs in granitic pegmatites and was first described for an occurrence in San Diego County, California in 1978.

Besides the San Diego, California area, Rynersonite is also found in Colorado and Kampala, Uganda.

References 

Niobium minerals
Tantalum minerals
Oxide minerals
Orthorhombic minerals
Minerals in space group 62
Minerals described in 1978